Forks, also previously known as the unincorporated town of Quillayute, is a city in southwest Clallam County, Washington, United States. The population was 3,335 at the 2020 census. It is named after the forks in the nearby Quillayute, Bogachiel, Calawah, and Sol Duc rivers.

For many years, the city's economy was fueled by the local timber industry. More recently it has drawn tourism related to the novel series Twilight and films of the same name, set in Forks. With recent declines in the timber industry, Forks has relied on the nearby Clallam Bay Corrections Center and Olympic Corrections Center as sources of jobs. Forks is a popular destination for sport fishers who fish for salmon and rainbow trout in nearby rivers. It is also supported by visitors to Olympic National Park.

History

Territory of the Quileute Native Americans 

Forks was once inhabited by the Quileute Native American tribe, before they ceded their territory. In 1889 a reservation was created near Forks the same year that Washington became a state. That same year the village was burnt down by settler Daniel Pullen. Forks is 12 miles from tribal burning areas that area tribes used to regenerate young ferns. The phrase "prairie upstream" from Quileute language was translated and became the name Forks Prairie.

Early settlement 

Early settlers to Forks came via the rivers and trails from the Pacific and the Strait of Juan de Fuca due to the lack of overland options. In the 1860s, men from Dungeness unsuccessfully attempted to convince the territorial legislature to create Quillehuyte County out of Clallam and Jefferson counties's western ends.

In January 1878, a mile east of Forks, Luther and Esther Ford arrived and laid claim to the 160-acre homestead (at the time there was already a few trappers living in the area). Ford set up the first dairy herd in the settlement in 1879. In 1884 a post office opened in Nelson's cabin. Since another Washington settlement already was named 'Ford's Prairie' the name 'Forks' was chosen as the name. The name 'Forks' was due to the prairie's location as a fork in the vicinity of three rivers.

It was difficult to receive and sell products in Forks in its early days since the nearest market was in Port Townsend (over 55 miles away). The small supply boat that was provided in the summers was not large enough for cargo either. Due to these problems, hops would regularly rot awaiting transport. It was not until narrow roads were built in the 1880s and 1890s that the situation improved slightly. Eventually canoes and ferries were used to help alleviate these issues. In 1927 a single car-sized road opened from Lake Crescent to Forks and the Olympic Loop Highway (U.S. 101) was built through Forks in 1931. The Mora post moved to Forks in the early 1890s which consisted of a general store, hardware store, and a hotel. In the early 1900s, hop growing declined and the Forks Cooperative Creamery was established which operated for 70 years.

Timber was cleared by settlers and small-time loggers in the late 1800s.  Booming logging camps were set up by timber baron Michael Earles in the early 1900s which attracted many workers to the area. In 1916, Merrill & Ring began to log in the Pysht River drainage northwest of the area. President Grover Cleveland placed individual claiming of timber volume off-limits in the Olympic Peninsula around this time which proved monumental for the area's future. The Olympic Forest Reserve was trimmed by 623,000 acres but it contained three-fourths of all timber by volume. The Olympic National Park took up the remaining parts of the reserve (it first became a monument in 1909). Isolation soon creeped into the area due to the 1907 national recession. Sitka spruce in the West End was provided during the First World War due to urgent demand. The U.S. Army's Spruce Production Division used this spruce to build 36 miles of railroad track from Port Angeles to Lake Pleasant in six months. But before it could be completed, World War I ended and no spruce was hauled down the line.

Settlers from the Hoh came gradually to Forks in its earlier days. In 1912 the town was laid out where the Whittier homestead stood and as late as the 1920s the town was just a block of buildings and prairie homesteads amongst looming forests. In 1930 the current newspaper, Forks Forum, started publication 40 years after the original Forks newspaper was established. Throughout the 1920s and 1930s, Forks gained many amenities of modern towns at the time as new inhabitants increased its population. Nearly 20 percent of the forest around Forks was flattened as what locals described as a "hurricane roaring overhead" swept through the West End. Five years later a fire occurred on Main Street before another fire hit the town in 1951.

Modern history 
Forks was officially incorporated on August 7, 1945, following an election of the constituents who would become its first town members.

The city gained popularity for being a key setting in Stephenie Meyer's Twilight series (2005 to 2008) and related film adaptations.

Demographics

2010 census
As of the census of 2010, there were 3,532 people, 1,264 households, and 849 families residing in the city. The racial makeup of the city was 67.7% White, 0.5% African American, 6.6% Native American, 1.2% Asian, 0.1% Pacific Islander, 18.1% from other races, and 5.9% from two or more races. Hispanic or Latino people of any race were 25.9% of the population.

There were 1,264 households, of which 40.9% had children under the age of 18 living with them, 46.0% were married couples living together, 13.5% had a female householder with no husband present, 7.7% had a male householder with no wife present, and 32.8% were non-families. 25.3% of all households were made up of individuals, and 8.2% had someone living alone who was 65 years of age or older. The average household size was 2.72 and the average family size was 3.16.

The median age in the city was 31.3 years. 29.2% of residents were under the age of 18; 10.3% were between the ages of 18 and 24; 27.6% were from 25 to 44; 23.2% were from 45 to 64; and 9.7% were 65 years of age or older. The gender makeup of the city was 51.5% male and 48.5% female.

2000 census
As of the census of 2000, there were 3,120 people, 1,169 households, and 792 families residing in the city. The population density was 854.8 people per square mile (330.2/km2). There were 1,361 housing units at an average density of 435.6 per square mile (168.4/km2). The racial makeup of the city was 81.47% White, 0.42% African American, 5.03% Native American, 1.51% Asian, 0.16% Pacific Islander, 8.49% from other races, and 2.92% from two or more races. Hispanic or Latino people of any race were 3.54% of the population.

There were 1,169 households, out of which 36.9% had children under the age of 18 living with them, 49.4% were married couples living together, 11.4% had a female householder with no husband present, and 32.2% were non-families. 24.6% of all households were made up of individuals, and 7.4% had someone living alone who was 65 years of age or older. The average household size was 2.65 and the average family size was 3.15.

In the city, the age distribution of the population shows 30.4% under the age of 18, 11.1% from 18 to 24, 27.2% from 25 to 44, 22.1% from 45 to 64, and 9.1% who were 65 years of age or older. The median age was 31 years. For every 100 females, there were 111.7 males. For every 100 females age 18 and over, there were 108.9 males.

The median income for a household in the city was $34,280, and the median income for a family was $38,844. Males had a median income of $35,718 versus $23,690 for females. The per capita income for the city was $13,686. About 14.6% of families and 20.5% of the population were below the poverty line, including 25.7% of those under age 18 and 12.4% of those age 65 or over.

Geography and climate
The city lies on Forks Prairie just east of the confluence of the Calawah River with the Bogachiel River. U.S. Route 101 passes through the town.
The Olympic rainforest surrounds the town.

Although there is a drying trend in summer, rain is still abundant, just not as wet as the rest of the year. Forks averages 212 days per year with measurable precipitation.

Government
The city is organized under Washington State law as a non-charter code city. Its structure is that of an elected mayor and a five-member elected city council. Unlike other cities on the Olympic Peninsula, Forks operates under what is called a "strong mayor" form of government with the mayor being the chief executive officer overseeing four department heads (clerk/treasurer, public works, police, and legal/planning).

Transportation

The airport has six based aircraft, including 3 single-engine aircraft and 3 helicopters. The latest available data indicate that the airport had a total of 13,550 annual operations. Runway 4-22 is Forks Municipal Airport's sole runway. Approaches to both ends of this runway are visual.

Forks is served by two public transit agencies. Clallam Transit route 17 provides local service in Forks, while three other routes provide connections to Port Angeles (14), La Push (15), and Clallam Bay and Neah Bay (16). Jefferson Transit runs an "Olympic Connection" bus that provides service on Highway 101 south of Forks as far as Lake Quinault. From there, transfers to Aberdeen are available via Grays Harbor transit. All five of these bus routes serve Forks six days a week, with no service on Sundays.

Media
Newspapers serving Forks include the Peninsula Daily News and the weekly Forks Forum, known as "the farthest west newspaper in the contiguous United States."

KBDB-FM 96.7, owned by Forks Broadcasting, is the only local commercial station serving the area. KNWU 91.5,  a satellite station of Washington State University's statewide Northwest Public Radio network, is the public radio station serving the area.

Education
Forks is a part of the Quillayute Valley School District, with Forks High School being the community's high school. Forks is home to the University of Washington's Olympic Natural Resources Center.

Economy and tourism

In 2003, an executive on the economic development council noted that 'Forks is going through a transition from a logging community to a tourist community'.

Constructed in 1989 by the Forks High School carpentry class, the  building provides a look into the local history of the timber industry, loggers of the past, and their tools of the trade. The museum has exhibits depicting local history dating to the 1870s.

Forks serves as the hub for numerous day excursions to the Hoh Rainforest, the Pacific Beaches, and various wilderness trails. Forks is well known for its winter steelhead fishing with the Quillayute river system – the Hoh, Sol Duc, Bogachiel and Calawah rivers. Other nearby Clallam, Sekiu, and Hoko rivers are also good for king salmon fishing and steelheading as well. Local guides are available for both native and hatchery runs and for float trips. Fishing gear and clothing is available at local stores.

Another source of tourism is Stephenie Meyer's Twilight series, which she set in the town after searching Google for rainy settings. Tours are available of locations that resemble the places described in Meyer's books. The majority of the films were not shot in Forks, though key scenes were shot in the town and surrounding area.

In December 2005, 74 visitors signed the guest book at the Forks Visitor Center; after the release of the Twilight series this increased substantially, with 2540 visitors signing in to the center in December 2009. In July of that year, the number was 16,186. The average annual number of tourists visiting the town rose from 10,000 before Twilight to 19,000 in 2008, the year of the first film, and 73,000 by 2010.

Tillicum Park

Forks displays one of a few Shay engines remaining in Washington. Shay locomotives are unusual in that they have a crank shaft running down the side, powering all wheels. They were designed to be used to transport lumber out of forests. Rayonier #10 (c/n 3348) was built for stock by Lima in 1930. It has three cylinders and three trucks. The Ozette Timber Company bought it 11 years later. In 1945 it was acquired by Rayonier for their lumber operation near Forks. It was retired near the north end of Forks in Tillicum Park in 1959.

The Forks Lions Club erected an attractive shelter over the #10 in 1999. It has also built and maintained most of the structures in the Shay Tillicum Park over the last 40 years.

Community events

Rainfest, a celebration of the arts sponsored by the West Olympic Council for the Arts, occurs in April. It includes a combination of arts and craft related events. In recent years quilt classes and a quilt show have been sponsored by the Piece Makers Quilt Club.

In March of every year, the Quillayute Valley Scholarship Auction occurs. This annual fundraising event raises tens of thousands of dollars for scholarships. Since the first scholarship award in 1964, to Robert Henry (now D.D.S.), the Committee has awarded over US$1m in scholarships to Forks students.

In the summer, Forks hosts its traditional "Old Fashioned Fourth of July" celebration with a Grand Fourth of July Parade. The numerous events include a demolition derby and fireworks display. July is also the month for Quileute Days at La Push with its parade, traditional salmon bake, bone games, softball tournament, canoe races, and street fair. In August, the Forks Family Festival combines arts and crafts vendors with children activities.

In late September, the Forks Chamber of Commerce partners with the Quileute Tribe and the City of Forks to host the Last Chance Fishing Derby at La Push; cash prizes are offered to those wanting to fish for salmon on the Pacific Ocean. The first week in October is when the community celebrates its heritage during Heritage Days. One of the more celebrated events during this week-long festival is the "Old Timers Round Table;" this is a moderated conversation broadcast live via the local radio station, featuring longtime residents of the region talking about days long past.

The Forks City Council passed a resolution in 2007 celebrating Stephenie Meyer Day in honor of the Twilight young adult novels and film series, set for September 13, the day of the fictional Bella's birthday. In 2015 the event was still driving tourism, with visitor numbers peaking in 2010, then settling to 50% more than before the Twilight phenomenon.
Stephenie Meyer Day has been replaced with the Forever Twilight in Forks Festival which is still celebrated annually on the week of September 13. The festival includes a movie marathon, a blood drive, and dance lessons.

See also

 Cape Flattery
 Olympic Animal Sanctuary (2006-2013)
 Olympic Mountains

References

Notes

External links

 
 Forks Chamber of Commerce
 

Cities in Washington (state)
Cities in Clallam County, Washington